The Gambian records in swimming are the fastest ever performances of swimmers from The Gambia, which are recognised and ratified by the Gambia Swimming & Aquatic Sports Association.

All records were set in finals unless noted otherwise.

Long Course (50 m)

Men

Women

Short Course (25 m)

Men

Women

References

Gambia
Records
Swimming
Swimming